Springfield School may refer to:

Springfield School, Portsmouth, a secondary school in Portsmouth, Hampshire, England
Springfield School, Richmond, a historic school building in Richmond, Virginia, United States

See also
Springfield High School (disambiguation)
Springfield (disambiguation)